Vyuham in classical Indian military science, is the strategic positioning and deploying of an army in such a way that the opponent's force is blunted / thwarted and increases the threat to the opponent. Padmavyuham was the legendary 'positioning' of the kaurava army against the pandava might to trap abhimanyu.

Vyuha is strategic placement of available resources of an army at war. It is a formation and derives its name and ways to act and perform according to many things found in nature and in daily use.

In case of the Padma-vyuham, the army formation is in the form of a lotus with strategic placement of the cavalry, footsoldiers, swordsmen, charioteers, elephants, etc., in an attempt to deliver maximum damage to the opposing force as well as protecting the principal participants from the enemy. The lotus formation facilitated and worked on the pattern of opening of petals thereby surrounding more of the enemies and then closing of the petals thereby trapping them and rendering them ineffective.

There are a number of such formations and operate on the basis of the objects/animals they derive their names from, like 
suchika-mukha-vyuham (shaped like a needle tip)
makar-vyuham (shaped like a crocodile)
garuda-yuham (shaped like a hawk)
baana-vyuham(shaped like an arrow)
ghata-vyuham(shaped like a pot)

The padma-vyuham is sometimes considered to be laid to trap abhimanyu, which is not correct, actually abhimanyu was trapped in the chakra-vyuham (formation like a turning wheel), wherein the army in consequent concentric circles moved in the opposite direction thereby trapping and confusing the enemy, and protecting its core which was the only vulnerable point of the entire formation. The core once pierced would throw the entire vyuham in a disarray

References

Military of India
Tactical formations